

Events and publications

Year overall
 Batman: The Dark Knight Returns, a four-issue limited series written and drawn by Frank Miller and published by DC Comics, debuts. It reintroduces Batman to the general public as the psychologically dark character of his original 1930s conception, and helps to usher in an era of "grim and gritty" superheroes from the mid-1980s to the mid-1990s.
Watchmen, a twelve-issue limited series written by Alan Moore, illustrated by Dave Gibbons and published by DC Comics, debuts. To date, Watchmen remains the only graphic novel to win a Hugo Award, and is also the only graphic novel to appear on Time's 2005 list of "the 100 best English-language novels from 1923 to the present."
 The first volume of Maus, written and drawn by Art Spiegelman debuts. Maus is a biography, presented in comics form, of Spiegelman's father, Vladek Spiegelman, a survivor of the Nazi Holocaust. Spiegelman was awarded a 1992 Pulitzer Prize Special Award for Maus shortly after its completion in 1991.
 A plethora of new independent publishers enter the comics arena, including ACE Comics, Adventure Publications, Apple Comics, Crystal Publications, Dark Horse Comics, Eternity Comics, Fantagor Press, Gladstone Comics, Malibu Comics, Pied Piper Comics, Silverwolf Comics, Slave Labor Graphics, Solson Publications, and Spotlight Comics. Conversely, Lodestone Comics and Sirius Comics/New Sirius Productions go out of business.
The Man of Steel, a six-issue comic book limited series written and penciled by John Byrne, inked by Dick Giordano and published by DC Comics, debuts. The mini-series is designed to revamp the Superman mythos, using the history-altering effects of Crisis on Infinite Earths as an explanation for numerous changes to previous continuity.
 The "Born Again" story arc runs in Marvel Comics' Daredevil (issues #227 to #233), written by Frank Miller and drawn by David Mazzucchelli.
 The "Mutant Massacre" crossover storyline runs through Marvel Comics in the fall. It primarily involves the superhero teams the X-Men, X-Factor, and the New Mutants. Power Pack, Thor, and Daredevil cross over for an issue in their own titles.
Captain Confederacy, created by Will Shetterly and Vince Stone, debuts, published by SteelDragon Press. It will run 12 issues.
 DC publishes Heroes Against Hunger starring Superman and Batman, an all-star benefit book for African famine relief and recovery.
 Marvel Super Special, with issue #41, about Howard the Duck, is cancelled by Marvel Comics.
 André Franquin and Jean-François Moyersoen establish Marsu Productions.

January 
 January 20: The final episode of Marten Toonder's Tom Poes is published. Olivier B. Bommel marries Annemarie Doddeltje, while Tom Poes leaves and roams the Earth.
 With issue #323, DC cancels World's Finest Comics.

February
 The French publisher Delcourt enters the marketplace, cancelling the comics magazine Charlie Mensuel and merging its contents with Pilote magazine.
 With issue #329, DC cancels Wonder Woman.
 With issue #152, Marvel cancels The Defenders.
 With issue #75, Marvel cancels ROM.
 With issue #34, Marvel cancels Epic Illustrated.

March 
 March 3: The first episode of Jim Davis' U.S. Acres is published. It will run until 1989. 
 March 22: British comic magazine The Beano organizes a publicity stunt, where in the latest episode of Dennis the Menace and Gnasher Dennis' dog Gnasher suddenly disappears. Over the next two months, his absence is used to intrigue readers and make them wonder about the dog's whereabouts. The mystery receives remarkable media attention. On 5 May, Gnasher returns. 
 March 22 - 13 April: The first annual comics festival of Knokke, Belgium (Stripfestival Knokke, nowadays Stripfestival Middelkerke), is organized.
 Wonder Man #1 one-shot, by David Michelinie, Kerry Gammill, and Vince Colletta; published by Marvel Comics.
 Broadside, a comic strip by Jeff Bacon, begins appearing in the Navy Times.

April 
 The Enchanted Apples of Oz, First Graphic Novel #5, by Eric Shanower (First Comics).
 With issue #106, Archie Comics cancels Archie's TV Laugh-Out.
 With issue #71, DC Comics cancels The Best of DC
 April 10: Metalzoic (DC Graphic Novel #6), by Pat Mills and Kevin O'Neill, published by DC Comics.
 Daniel Clowes's Lloyd Llewellyn makes its debut.

May 
 Green Lantern #200: "Five Billion Years," by Steve Englehart, Joe Staton, and Bruce D. Patterson. (DC Comics)
 The Incredible Hulk #319: Bruce Banner marries Betty Ross. (Marvel Comics)
 With issue #20, Marvel cancels Micronauts: The New Voyages.

June 
 June 7: The final episode of Bill Schorr's Conrad is published.
 With issue #201, DC changes the title of the Green Lantern comic book to The Green Lantern Corps.
 The Thing, with issue #36, is cancelled by Marvel.

July 
 July 2: Dick Matena wins the Stripschapprijs. Hans van den Boom receives the P. Hans Frankfurtherprijs.
 Dark Horse Comics makes its debut as a publisher with the anthology Dark Horse Presents #1.
 Hawkman Special (DC Comics), by Tony Isabella, Richard Howell, and Ron Randall.
 With issue #107, Marvel cancels its Star Wars comic.

August 
 Aristocratic Xtraterrestrial Time-Traveling Thieves "Micro Series" #1 (Comics Interview), by Henry Vogel and Mark Propst.

September 
 Alan Moore, Dave Gibbons and John Higgins' Watchmen is first published.
 "Whatever Happened to the Man of Tomorrow?," a two-part Superman story, appears in Superman #423 and Action Comics #583. Written by Alan Moore, with art by Curt Swan, George Pérez, and Kurt Schaffenberger; published by DC Comics.
 DC suspends publication of Superman; in 1987 the title relaunches as The Adventures of Superman (continuing the numbering of Superman).
 DC suspends publication of Action Comics (until January 1987) to allow for the publication of John Byrne's The Man of Steel limited series and Byrne's revamp of the Superman character/franchise.
 With issue #97, DC cancels DC Comics Presents.
 Power Man and Iron Fist, with issue #125, is cancelled by Marvel.
 September 27: Warlord, with issue #627, is merged with Victor (D.C. Thomson).

October 
 October 4: 
 The final episode of Pat Mills and Joe Colquhoun's Charley's War is prepublished in Battle Picture Weekly.
 The final The Adventures of Tintin album Tintin and the Alph-Art, which remained unfinished, is published in its sketched-out form.
 October 18: The Dutch comics store Lambiek in Amsterdam opens their art gallery. The first exhibition centers around the comics magazine RAW. In the following years the store will host several other exhibitions, inviting national and international comics artists over to exhibit their drawings and sign their work. It will make the store internationally famous in comics circles.
 Marvel Comics launches the New Universe, an imprint created in celebration of Marvel's 25th anniversary. Comics published by New Universe are in a distinctly separate world, fully divorced from the mainstream continuity of the Marvel Universe, consisting of its own continuing characters and stories in a more realistic setting. The New Universe's first titles are Spitfire and The Troubleshooters and Star Brand.
 Batman #400: 68-page anniversary issue, "Resurrection Night," by Doug Moench and an all-star roster of artists, including Bill Sienkiewicz, John Byrne, George Pérez, Art Adams, and Brian Bolland. (DC Comics)

November 
 November 1: The first episode of Gnasher and Gipper, starring Gnasher and his son Gipper, is published in The Beano, drawn by David Sutherland. 
 November 3: Ralph Dunagin and Dana Summers' The Middletons makes its debut.
 Hergé's widow, Fanny Rodwell, disestablishes Studio Hergé and replaces it a year later by the Hergé Foundation, aka Moulinsart.
 Marvel's New Universe imprint launches six more titles: D.P. 7, Justice, Kickers, Inc., Mark Hazzard: Merc, Nightmask, and Psi-Force.
 DC Comics begins publishing "Legends," a crossover storyline that runs through a six-issue, self-titled limited series and various other DC titles published (22 chapters in all) in 1986 and 1987.

December 
 Blue Devil, with issue #31, is canceled by DC Comics
 With issue #15, Comico publishes the final issue of Matt Wagner's Mage: The Hero Discovered
 Amazing High Adventure, with issue #5, publishes its final issue. (Marvel Comics)
 Chester Brown's Yummy Fur begins professional publication by Vortex Comics

Births

Deaths

January
 January 6: George Sixta, American comics artist (Dick Draper, Foreign Correspondent, Rivets), dies at age 74.
 January 10: Marvin Bradley, American comics artist (Rex Morgan, M.D.), passes away at the age of 72.
 January 11: Kazuo Kamimura, Japanese manga artist (Lady Snowblood), dies at the age of 45 from a pharynx tumor.
 January 15: Alfred Bestall, British comics artist (continued Rupert Bear), dies at age 93.
 January 23: Frank Grundeen, American animator and comics artist (continued the Donald Duck newspaper comic strip), dies at age 74.
 January 28: Allen Saunders, American journalist, writer and comics writer (Steve Roper and Mike Nomad, Mary Worth, Kerry Drake), dies at age 86.

February
 February 21: Derek Chittock, aka Droc, aka Lucian, British art critic, painter and cartoonist (Bennie, Barley Bottom), dies at age 64.
 February 22: Ernest Shaw, British comics artist (The Gay Goblins, Mr. and Mrs. Dillwater, Dr. Gnome of Gnomansland, The Dingbats), dies at the age of 95.

March 
 March 4: Maurice Julhès, French illustrator and comics artist (Monsieur Lezognard), dies at age 89.
 March 19: Stephen P. Dowling, British comics artist (Garth, Ruggles, Belinda), passes away at the age of 82, coincidentally his birthday.
 Specific date unknown: Unk White, Australian comics artist, illustrator and painter (Freckles), dies at age 85 or 86.

April
 April 2: Jack Manning, American comics artist and animator (Disney comics, Looney Tunes comics, Hanna-Barbera comics), dies at age 65.
 April 7: Don Moore, American comics writer (scripted Flash Gordon and Jungle Jim), passes away at age 81. 
 April 16: John Churchill Chase, American comics artist and historian (Louisiana Purchase, We The People), dies at age 80 or 81.
 April 22: Dick Moores, American comics artist and animator (Jim Hardy, Scamp, worked on Dick Tracy, Disney comics, continued Gasoline Alley), dies at age 75.
 April: Stefano Tamburini, Italian comics writer (RanXerox) dies from a drug overdose at the age of 40 or 41.

May
 May 8: Klaus Schönefeld, Canadian comic artist (worked on Stig's Inferno and Mister X), dies at age 23 from heart failure.  
 May 15: Virginia Krausmann, American comics artist (continued Annibelle, Marianne), dies at age 73.

June
 June 21: Gaston Martineau, aka Aldé, French journalist, writer and comics artist (Mistouflet), dies at age 61.
 June 23: 
 Lex Metz, Dutch illustrator and comics artist (De Kabouterboekjes, Pukkel en de Blauwe Ogen van Jan Beilder), dies at age 73.
 Bela Szepes, Hungarian swimmer, skier, journalist sculptor and comics artist, dies at age 82.

July 
 July 22: Floyd Gottfredson, American comics artist (Mickey Mouse comics), dies at age 81.

August 
 August 10: Marie Hjuler, Danish illustrator and comic artist (Lone og Lille Lasse), passes away at age 91.

September 
 September 4: Edd Ashe, American illustrator and comics artist (continued Don Winslow of the Navy), dies at age 78.

October
 October 4: Mike Butterworth, British comics writer (Wulf the Briton, The Trigan Empire, Storm), passes away at age 62.
 October 10: Frank O'Neal, American comics artist (Short Ribs), dies at age 64.
 October 11: David Hand, American animator and film director (Walt Disney Company, Gaumont), dies at age 86.
 October 22: Bert Hill, British comics artist (Charlie Chuckle, Barnacle Ben, the Breezy Buccaneer, Freddie Freewheel the Tramp Cyclist, Sammy Spry, Frolics in the Far West, Tommy Trot the Tudor Tramp, Harry Coe, P.C. Copperclock the Desert Cop, Willie Scribble the Pavement Artist, Lil and Lena), dies at age 84.
 October 23: Marcel Moniquet, Belgian comic artist (Aviorix), dies at age 89.

November 
 November 19: Klaus Nordling, Finnish-American comics artist (Thin Man), dies at age 86.
 November 23: Norman Maurer, American comics artist, animator, screenwriter, film producer  and animated film producer (Mighty Mouse comics, celebrity comics about The Three Stooges), dies at age 60 from cancer.
 November 23: Frank Smith, American animator and comics artist (continued the Donald Duck newspaper comic, made Hanna-Barbera comics and a comic strip based on W.C. Fields), passes away at the age of 78.
 November 24: Al Smith, American comics artist (continued Mutt and Jeff) and founder of Al Smith Feature Service, dies at age 84.
 November 27: Colin Dawkins, American comics writer (EC Comics), dies at age 64.

December 
 December 6: August Lenox, American painter and comics artist (Walt Disney's True Life Adventure Comics), dies at age 77 or 78.
 December 19: Frank Sels, Belgian comics artist (Zilverpijl (aka Silbertpfeil), assisted Willy Vandersteen and Karel Verschuere), commits suicide at age 44.
 December 24: Gardner Fox, American comics writer (The Flash,  Hawkman, The Justice League), dies at age 75.
 Specific date in December unknown: Paul Frehm, American comics artist (continued Ripley's Believe It or Not!), dies at age 82.

Specific date unknown
 Joaquin Blázquez, Spanish comics artist, painter and sculptor dies at age 39 or 40.
 Les Callan, Canadian cartoonist and comics artist (Monty and Johnny), dies at age 80 or 81.
 Joe Certa, American comics artist (Martian Manhunter, Zook, continued Joe Palooka), dies at age 66 or 67.
 Edgardo Dell'Acqua, Italian comics artist (Gim Toro), passes away at age 63 or 64.
 Renaat Demoen, Belgian comics artist and illustrator (Zonneland), dies at the age of 71 or 72.
 Zvonimir Furtinger, Croatian comics writer (Herlock Sholmes), dies at age 83 or 84.
 Ed Kressy, American comics artist (comics based on The Lone Ranger), dies at age 84.
 Bernard Segal, American painter and comics artist (Honey and Hank aka Elsworth), dies at age 78 or 79.

Exhibitions and shows
 July 15-November 16: Jewish Museum, New York City — "Jewish Themes / Contemporary American Artists II", featuring original drawings and sketches from Art Spiegelman's Maus

Conventions
 April 11–13: 2nd Annual Victoria International Cartoon Festival (Victoria, British Columbia, Canada)
 May 31–June 1: Birmingham Comic Art Show (Motorcycle Museum, NEC, Birmingham, England) — presentation of the Eagle Awards
 July 4–6: Chicago Comicon (Ramada O'Hare Hotel, Rosemont, Illinois) — 5,000 attendees; official guests: Stan Lee (guest of honor), George Pérez (special guest), Doug Wildey
 July 4–6: Dallas Fantasy Fair I (Dallas Marriott Park Central, Dallas, Texas) — guests include Dave Stevens, Gary Groth, Pat Broderick, Will Eisner, Mike Gustovich, Burne Hogarth, Gil Kane, Jack Kirby, Joe Kubert, William Messner-Loebs, Frank Miller, Jean Giraud, Doug Moench, Richard Pini, Dave Sim, Donald Simpson, Alex Toth, Doug Wildey, Neal Barrett, Jr., David A. Cherry, Carole Nelson Douglas, George R.R. Martin, Ardath Mayhar, Warren Norwood, Frederik Pohl, Kay Reynolds, Fred Saberhagen, Lewis Shiner, John Steakley, Howard Waldrop, Jack Williamson, Philip José Farmer, Roger Zelazny
 July 19–20: Creation Philadelphia (Centre Hotel, Philadelphia, Pennsylvania) — guests include John Romita, Jr. and Archie Goodwin
 July 31–August 3: San Diego Comic-Con (Convention and Performing Arts Center and Hotel San Diego, California) — 6,500 attendees; official guests: Poul Anderson, Marion Zimmer Bradley, Greg Evans, Stan Lee, Dale Messick, Frank Miller, Moebius, Mart Nodell, Harvey Pekar, Jim Valentino, and Doug Wildey
 August 2–4: Atlanta Fantasy Fair (Omni Hotel and Georgia World Congress Center, Atlanta, Georgia) — 5,000 attendees; comics guests include Chris Claremont, Denny O'Neil, Stan Lee, Ralph Bakshi, Matt Feazell, Kelly Freas, Dave Gibbons, Greg Hildebrandt, Jim Starlin, John Romita, Sr., Boris Vallejo, and Bob Burden; science fiction/fantasy writers include Robert Asprin, John Varley, Brad Strickland, and Diane Duane; media guests include Carl Macek, Don Kennedy, and Steve Jackson of Steve Jackson Games
 August 9–10: Creation Los Angeles (Hyatt Hotel, Los Angeles, California) — guests include John Romita, Jr. and Terry Austin
 August 9–10: King Kon (Dearborn Civic Center, Dearborn, MI): guests include Ron Frenz, Al Milgrom, William Messner-Loebs, and Max Allan Collins; participating publishers include Marvel, DC, Arrow Comics, Stabur Graphics, and Vortex Comics; c. 2,500 attendees
 August 22–23: Comix Fair (Brookhollow Marriott, Houston, Texas) — guests include Gary Groth, Gil Kane, Joe Pumilia, Jeff Millar, Bill Hinds, and Doug Potter
 August 23–24: Creation Manhattan (Roosevelt Hotel, New York City) — special tribute to Marvel Comics' 25th anniversary; guests include Stan Lee and Jim Shooter
 August 23–24: Creation San Francisco (Holiday Inn Golden Gateway, San Francisco, California)
 September 6–7: Creation Washington, D.C. (Marriott Twin Bridges Hotel, Arlington, Virginia)
 September 20–21: Creation New Jersey (Hyatt Regency, New Brunswick, New Jersey)
 September 20–21: UKCAC (University of London Union, Malet Street, London, England) — guests include  Bill Marks, Seth Motter, Dean Motter, David Lloyd, Frank Miller, Lynn Varley, Steve Leialoha, Lew Stringer, Glen Fabry, Gil Kane, John Bolton, Karen Berger, Alan Moore, Jenette Kahn, Dave Gibbons, Kevin O'Neill, Brett Ewins, Carl Potts, Alan Grant, Barry Windsor-Smith, Bryan Talbot, Bill Sienkiewicz, and Chris Claremont
 November 8–9: Mid-Ohio Con (Richland County Fairgrounds, Mansfield, Ohio) — guests of honor: Frank Miller, John Byrne, Stephen R. Bissette, John Totleben, and Bill Sienkiewicz
 November 14–16: Dallas Fantasy Fair II (Dallas Marriott Park Central, Dallas, Texas) — celebration of the 25th anniversary of Marvel Comics; guests include Stan Lee

Awards

Eagle Awards 
Presented in 1987 for comics published in 1986:

American Section 
 Favourite Comic: Swamp Thing, written by Alan Moore (DC)
 Favourite New Title: Watchmen, written by Alan Moore (DC)
 Favourite Finite Series: Crisis on Infinite Earths, by Marv Wolfman and George Pérez (DC Comics)
 Favourite Graphic Novel: Batman: The Dark Knight Returns (DC)
 Favourite Single or Continued Story: Batman: The Dark Knight Returns (DC)
 Favourite Comic Cover: Batman: The Dark Knight Returns #1, by Frank Miller and Lynn Varley
 Favourite Group or Team: The X-Men
 Favourite Character: Batman
 Favourite Supporting Character: John Constantine, from Swamp Thing (DC)
 Favourite Character Worthy of Own Title: Wolverine
 Favourite Villain: The Joker
 Favourite Writer: Alan Moore
 Favourite Artist: Frank Miller
 Favourite Inker: Terry Austin
 Favourite Specialist Comics Publication: Amazing Heroes

UK Section 
 Favourite Artist: Alan Davis
 Favourite Writer: Alan Moore
 Favourite Comic: 2000 AD (IPC)
 Favourite Comic Album: D.R. & Quinch's Totally Awesome Guide to Life, written by Alan Moore
 Favourite Character: Judge Dredd, from 2000 AD
 Favourite Villain: Torquemada, from 2000 AD
 Favourite Supporting Character: Ukko the Dwarf (from Sláine)
 Character Most Worthy of Own Title: Captain Britain
 Favourite Single or Continued Story: Halo Jones Three, written by Alan Moore
 Favourite New Title: Redfox (Harrier Comics)
 Favourite Comic Cover: 2000 AD #500
 Favourite Specialist Comics Publication: Speakeasy
 Roll of Honour:
 Frank Miller
 (nominated) Jerry Siegel
 (nominated) Joe Shuster

Kirby Awards 
 Best Single Issue: "Apocalypse," Daredevil #227, by Frank Miller and David Mazzucchelli (Marvel Comics)
 Best Continuing Series: Swamp Thing, by Alan Moore, Steve Bissette, and John Totleben (DC Comics)
 Best Black & White Series: Love and Rockets by Gilbert Hernandez and Jaime Hernandez (Fantagraphics)
 Best Finite Series: Crisis on Infinite Earths, by Marv Wolfman and George Pérez (DC)
 Best New Series: Miracleman, by Alan Moore and various artists (Eclipse Comics)
 Best Graphic Album: The Rocketeer, by Dave Stevens (Eclipse)
 Best Artist: Steve Rude, for Nexus (First Comics)
 Best Writer: Alan Moore, for Swamp Thing (DC)
 Best Writer/Artist (single or team): Frank Miller and David Mazzucchelli, for Daredevil (Marvel)
 Best Art Team: George Pérez and Jerry Ordway, for Crisis On Infinite Earths (DC)

First issues by title

DC Comics 
Angel Love
 Release: August. Writer/Artist: Barbara Slate.

Blue Beetle
 Release: June. Writer: Len Wein. Artists: Paris Cullins and Bruce Patterson.

Booster Gold
 Release: February. Writer/Artist: Dan Jurgens.

Electric Warrior
 Release: May. Writer: Doug Moench. Artist: Jim Baikie.

Hawkman
 Release: August. Writer: Tony Isabella. Artists: Richard Howell and Don Heck.

'Mazing Man
 Release: January. Writer: Bob Rozakis. Artist: Stephen DeStefano.

Secret Origins
 Release: April. Editor: Roy Thomas.

Teen Titans Spotlight
 Release: August. Writer: Marv Wolfman. Artists: Denys Cowan and Dick Giordano.

Limited series 
Batman: The Dark Knight Returns (4 issues)
 Release: February. Writer/Artist: Frank Miller.

Cosmic Boy (4 issues)
 Release: December. Writer: Paul Levitz. Artists: Keith Giffen, Ernie Colón, and Bob Smith.

The Legend of Wonder Woman
 Release: May. Writers: Trina Robbins and Kurt Busiek. Artist: Trina Robbins.

Legends (6 issues)
 Release: November. Writers: John Ostrander and Len Wein. Artists: John Byrne and Karl Kesel.

Legionnaires 3
 Release: February. Writers: Keith Giffen and Mindy Newell. Artist: Ernie Colón.

Lords of the Ultra-Realm
 Release: June. Writer: Doug Moench. Artist: Pat Broderick.

The Man of Steel (6 issues)
 Release: July. Writer/Artist: John Byrne.

Watchmen (12 issues)
 Release: September. Writer: Alan Moore. Artist: Dave Gibbons.

Dupuis 
Les Femmes en Blanc (32 volumes)
Artist: Philippe Bercovici. Writer: Raoul Cauvin.

Marvel Comics 
Acorn Green
 Release: October

Classic X-Men
 Release: September. Editor: Ann Nocenti.

G.I. Joe Special Missions
 Release: October. Writer: Larry Hama. Artist: Herb Trimpe.

Master of the Universe
 Release: May by Star Comics. Writer: Mike Carlin. Artists: Ron Wilson and Dennis Janke.

The 'Nam
 Release: December. Writer: Doug Murray. Artist: Michael Golden and Armando Gil.

Spider-Man and Zoids
 Release: March by Marvel UK. Writer: Ian Rimmer. Artist: Kev Hopgood.

Strikeforce: Morituri
 Release: December. Writer: Peter B. Gillis. Artist: Brent Anderson.

X-Factor
 Release: February. Writer: Bob Layton. Artist: Jackson Guice.

New Universe 
D.P. 7
 Release: November. Writer: Mark Gruenwald. Artists: Paul Ryan and Romeo Tanghal.

Justice
 Release: November. Writer: Archie Goodwin. Artists: Geof Isherwood, Joe DelBeato, and Jack Fury.

Kickers, Inc.
 Release: November. Writer: Tom DeFalco. Artists: Ron Frenz and Sal Buscema.

Mark Hazzard: Merc
 Release: November. Writer: Peter David. Artist: Gray Morrow.

Nightmask
 Release: November. Writer: Archie Goodwin. Artists: Tony Salmons and Bret Blevins.

Psi-Force
 Release: November. Writer: Steve Perry. Artists: Mark Texeira and Kyle Baker.

Spitfire and The Troubleshooters
 Release: October. Writers: Eliot R. Brown, John Morelli, and Gerry Conway. Artists: Herb Trimpe, Joe Sinnott, and Tom Morgan.

Star Brand
 Release: October. Writer: Jim Shooter. Artists: John Romita, Jr. and Al Williamson.

Limited series 
Dakota North (5 issues)
 Release: November. Writer: Martha Thomases. Artist: Tony Salmons.

Elektra: Assassin (8 issues)
 Release: August by Epic Comics. Writer: Frank Miller. Artist: Bill Sienkiewicz.

The Punisher (5 issues)
 Release: January. Writer: Steven Grant. Artists: Mike Zeck and John Beatty.

Steelgrip Starkey (6 issues)
 Release: July by Epic Comics. Writer/Artist: Alan Weiss. Inker: James Sherman.

Independent titles 
Dark Horse Presents
 Release: July by Dark Horse Comics. Editor: Randy Stradley.

Dice Man
 Release: by IPC Media. Editor: Pat Mills.

Dylan Dog
 Release: October by Sergio Bonelli Editore. Writer: Tiziano Sclavi.

Dynamo Joe
 Release: May by First Comics. Writer: John Ostrander. Artist: Doug Rice.

Elric: The Weird of the White Wolf
 Release: October by First Comics. Writer: Roy Thomas. Artists: Michael T. Gilbert and George Freeman.

Hamster Vice
 Release: June by Blackthorne Publishing. Writer/Artist: Dwayne Ferguson.

Jonny Quest
 Release: June by Comico. Editor: Diana Schutz

Karmatron
 Release: February by ¡Ka-Boom! Estudio. Writer/Artist: Oscar González Loyo.

night life
 Release: by Strawberry Jam Comics. Writer: Derek McCulloch. Artist: Simon Tristam.

Omaha the Cat Dancer
 Release: October by Kitchen Sink Press. Writer/Artist: Reed Waller.

The Puma Blues
 Release: October by Aardvark One International. Writer: Stephen Murphy. Artist: Michael Zulli.

Reagan's Raiders
 Release: October by Solson Publications: Writer: Monroe Arnold. Artists: Dick Ayers and Rich Buckler.

Samurai Penguin
 Release: June by Slave Labor Graphics: Writer: Dan Vado. Artists: Dan Buck and Mark Buck.

Yummy Fur
 Release: December by Vortex Comics. Cartoonist: Chester Brown

Limited series 
Rip in Time
 Release: by Fantagor Press. Writer: Bruce Jones. Artist: Richard Corben.

Akita Shoten 
For Mrs.

Shueisha 
Young You

Initial appearances by character name

DC Comics 

 Bad Samaritan, in The Outsiders #03, (January)
 Booster Gold, in Booster Gold #01 (February)
Brimstone, in Legends #01 (November)
 Duke of Oil, in The Outsiders #06 (April)
 Film Freak, in Batman #395 (May)
 Hybrid, in New Teen Titans #24 (October)
 Carrie Kelley, in Batman: The Dark Knight Returns #01 (February)
Kilowog, in Green Lantern Corps # 201 (June)
 Prometheus, in New Teen Titans #24 (October)
 Skeets, in Booster Gold #1 (February)
Sodam Yat, in Tales of the Green Lantern Corps Annual #02 (December)
 Amanda Waller, in Legends #01 in (November)
 Vigilante (Dave Winston), in Vigilante #28 (April)
Vic Sage in Blue Beetle #04 (September)
 Watchmen
 Crimebusters, in Watchmen #02 (October)
 The Comedian, in Watchmen #01 (September)
Doctor Manhattan, in Watchmen #01 (September)
Nite Owl (Dan Dreiberg), in Watchmen #01 (September)
Ozymandias, in Watchmen #01 (September)
Rorschach, in Watchmen #01 (September)
Silk Spectre (Laurie Juspeczyk), in Watchmen #01 (September)
Minutemen, in Watchmen #02 (October)
 Captain Metropolis, in Watchmen #01 (September)
 Dollar Bill, in Watchmen #02 (October)
 Hooded Justice, in Watchmen #01 (September)
Mothman, in Watchmen #02 (October)
 Nite Owl (Hollis Mason), in Watchmen #01 (September)
 Silhouette, in Watchmen #02 (October)
 Silk Spectre (Sally Juspeczyk), in Watchmen #01 (September)
Bubastis in Watchmen #01 (September)
Moloch The Mystic in Watchmen #02 (October)
Magpie in The Man of Steel #03 (November)
Michelle Carter in Booster Gold #06 (July)
Ranx the Sentient City in Tales of the Green Lantern Corps Annual #02 (December)
Icemaiden in Infinity Inc. #32 (November)
Kelex in The Man of Steel #01 (October)
Twister in New Teen Titans #26 (December)
Captain Triumph in History of the DC Universe #01
Owlwoman in Crisis on Infinite Earths #12 (March)

Marvel Comics 
 Apocalypse, in X-Factor #5 (June)
 Berzerker, in X-Factor #11 (December)
 Eddie Brock, in Web of Spider-Man #18 (September )
 Chance, in Web of Spider-Man #15 (June)
 Rusty Collins, in X-Factor #1 (February)
 Dakota North, in Dakota North #1 (June)
 Foreigner, in Web of Spider-Man #15 (June)
 Cameron Hodge, in X-Factor #1 (February)
 Artie Maddicks, in X-Factor #2 (March)
 Marauders, in Uncanny X-Men #210 (October)
 Arclight
 Blockbuster
 Harpoon
 Riptide
 Scalphunter
 Scrambler
 Mayhem, in Cloak and Dagger Vol. 2 #5 (March)
 Nuke, in Daredevil #232 (May)
 Persuasion, in Alpha Flight #41 (December)
 Prism, in X-Factor #10 (November)
 Sinister Syndicate, in The Amazing Spider-Man #280 (September)
 Skids, in X-Factor vol. #7 (August)
 Solo, in Web of Spider-Man #19 (October)
 Time Variance Authority, in Thor vol. 1 #372 (October)
 Tollbooth, in G.I. Joe: A Real American Hero #51 (September)
 U.S. Agent, in Captain America #323 (November)

Independent titles 

 Concrete, in Dark Horse Presents #1 (July, Dark Horse)
 Shojun the Warlord, in 2000 AD #451 (IPC Media)

References